In electronic audio technology, a patch point is a connection that allows a signal to be withdrawn from a device, modified in some way, and returned.  This can, for example, be done using a phone connector, using the tip of the plug for the outgoing mono signal, and the ring for the returning signal, a configuration known as "tip send, ring return". Commonly known as an insert on professional audio mixing consoles.

References 

Audiovisual connectors